Silver Tongue is the fourth studio album by American musician Torres. It was released on January 31, 2020 under Merge Records.

The first single from the album, "Good Scare" was released on October 29, 2019. The second single "Gracious Day" was released December 3, 2019.

Critical reception
Silver Tongue was met with generally favorable reviews from critics. At Metacritic, which assigns a weighted average rating out of 100 to reviews from mainstream publications, this release received an average score of 77, based on 19 reviews. Aggregator Album of the Year gave the album a score of 78 based on 16 reviews.

Accolades

Track listing

Personnel
 Mackenzie Scott – vocalist, guitar, producer, drums, synthesizer
 Bryan Bisordi – drums
 Jorge Elbrecht – mixing
 Heba Kadry – mastering
 Erin Manning - synthesizer
 Jeff Zeigler - engineer

References

2020 albums
Merge Records albums
Torres (musician) albums